Daniel Whyte is a former American Football player.

He played professional football for the Detroit Lions. In 1994, he helped found Club R.E.A.L, which aimed to help low-income children socialize and learn to accept responsibility, hard work and maintain positive attitudes.

References 

American football tight ends
Detroit Lions players
Living people
Year of birth missing (living people)